These are the international rankings of Libya.

Economy

 The Heritage Foundation/The Wall Street Journal 2009 Index of Economic Freedom ranked  171 out of 179

Energy
 Energy Information Administration 2006 Oil Reserves ranked 9 out of 20

Military

 Institute for Economics and Peace   Global Peace Index ranked 46 out of 144

Politics

Reporters Without Borders 2009  Press Freedom Index ranked 156 out of 175
 Transparency International 2008 Corruption Perceptions Index ranked 126 out of 180
Economist Intelligence Unit Shoe-Thrower's index ranked 2

Society
 The Economist Quality-of-Life Index ranked 70 out of 111
 United Nations Development Programme: 2010 Human Development Index ranked 53 out of 169

References

Libya